Joyce Castle (born Lillian Joyce Malicky, on January 17, 1939, in Beaumont, Texas) is an American mezzo-soprano who has had an active opera career for the last four decades. She earned degrees in music from The University of Kansas and the Eastman School of Music. She made her professional opera debut in 1970 at the San Francisco Opera as Siebel in Charles Gounod's Faust. In 1984 she became the first woman to portray Mrs. Lovett in an operatic staged production of Sweeney Todd at the Houston Grand Opera. She spent seven years performing with opera companies in France during the 1970s, after which her career has mainly been spent performing with opera companies throughout the United States. She has sung leading roles at the Metropolitan Opera for nine seasons and has also appeared frequently at the New York City Opera. Her career was profiled in the June 2010 issue of Opera News. She currently teaches on the voice faculty of the University of Kansas.

References

External links
Official Website of Joyce Castle

Living people
American operatic mezzo-sopranos
Eastman School of Music alumni
Kansas State University alumni
University of Kansas faculty
1944 births
People from Beaumont, Texas
American women academics
Singers from Texas
Classical musicians from Texas
Cedille Records artists
21st-century American women